The Catholic Church in Zambia is part of the worldwide Catholic Church, under the spiritual leadership of the Pope in Rome. There are over about three million Catholics in the country, or 21% of the total population.  There are ten dioceses, including two archdioceses.

History
The first missionaries to arrive in Zambia were the portuguese Dominicans in 1730. Later on, the first Jesuits in the country crossed the Zambezi River near Victoria Falls in 1879. Jesuit missions were established among the Tonga in 1902 and at Broken Hill in 1927. The White Fathers, entering from the north in 1891, had greater success in what is now Northern and Luapula Province. Permanent Catholic stations on the Copperbelt were provided by Italian Franciscans in 1931. In May 1959 Lusaka became a diocese, and later Kasama also became one. Some media outlets, such as Radio Icengelo and the National Mirror, are linked to the church, which has championed social justice issues and the early pro-democracy movement of the 1980s. For further details see History of Church activities in Zambia

Diocese 
There are 2 Archdioceses and 9 dioceses in Zambia

 Kasama
 Mansa 
 Mpika
 Lusaka
 Chipata
 Kabwe 
 Livingstone
 Mongu 
 Monze
 Ndola 
 Solwezi

References

External links 
 GCatholic.org 
 Catholic Hierarchy 

 
Zambia
Zambia